Adel Mechaal Mechaal (born 5 December 1990) is a Morocco-born Spanish middle- and long-distance runner. In the 1500 metres, he placed fourth at the 2017 World Championships, and fifth at the 2020 Tokyo Olympics. Over the 3000 and 5000 metres, Mechaal is a four-time European Championship medallist. He also won two medals for the men's senior races at the European Cross Country Championships.

In February 2022, Mechaal set a European indoor 3000 m record with a time of 7:30.82 at the New Balance Indoor Grand Prix in New York. He won multiple Spanish outdoor and indoor titles between 2015 and 2023 (1500 m, 3000 m, 5000 m)

Statistics

Personal bests
 800 metres – 1:47.69 (Barcelona 2019)
 1500 metres – 3:30.77 (Tokyo 2021)
 1500 metres indoor – 3:33.28 (Birmingham 2023)  
 3000 metres – 7:35.28 (Paris 2017)
 3000 metres indoor – 7:30.82 (New York 2022)
 5000 metres – 13:06.02 (Oslo 2022)
 10,000 metres – 27:50.56 (London 2018)
Road
 10 kilometres – 29:09 (Lisbon 2019)
 Half marathon – 1:02:30 (Gdynia 2020)

Competition record

National titles
 Spanish Athletics Championships
 1500 metres: 2015, 2017, 2021
 5000 metres: 2015, 2017
 Spanish Indoor Athletics Championships
 1500 metres: 2015, 2018, 2022
 3000 metres: 2015, 2017, 2018, 2020, 2021, 2022, 2023

References

External links

 
 
 
 
 

1990 births
Living people
Moroccan emigrants to Spain
Naturalised citizens of Spain
Spanish sportspeople of Moroccan descent
Spanish male middle-distance runners
Spanish male long-distance runners
Place of birth missing (living people)
World Athletics Championships athletes for Spain
Athletes (track and field) at the 2016 Summer Olympics
Athletes (track and field) at the 2020 Summer Olympics
Olympic athletes of Spain
European Athletics Championships medalists
People from Tétouan